Çırak (Turkish "apprentice") may refer to:

Çırak (film), 2014 film by Tayfun Belet 
:tr:Çırak (film), 2016 film directed by Emre Konuk
Çırak The Apprentice, hosted by Tuncay Özihan  
Zehra Çırak (1960) German writer

See also
Cirák, village in Hungary